Inauguration of Andrew Jackson may refer to: 

First inauguration of Andrew Jackson, 1829
Second inauguration of Andrew Jackson, 1833

See also